Myrmarachne spissa is a species of spider of the family Salticidae. It is endemic to Sri Lanka.

References

Salticidae
Spiders of Asia
Endemic fauna of Sri Lanka
Spiders described in 1892